The Boise River is a  tributary of the Snake River in the Northwestern United States. It drains a rugged portion of the Sawtooth Range in southwestern Idaho northeast of Boise, as well as part of the western Snake River Plain.

Description
The Boise River rises in three separate forks in the Sawtooth Range at elevations exceeding , and is formed by the confluence of its North and Middle forks. It flows generally southwest through the remote mountains in the Boise National Forest. The main stream flows southwest into Arrowrock Reservoir, joining the South Fork from the Anderson Ranch Dam.

It flows generally southwest, descending through a basalt canyon to fill the Anderson Ranch Reservoir, then turns northwest in central Elmore County.

Downstream from its confluence with the South Fork, the river flows generally west, adds the major tributary of Mores Creek along Highway 21, and passes through Lucky Peak Dam to emerge from the foothills southeast of Boise. It passes over several irrigation diversion dams above the city, the first and largest is the century-old Boise River Diversion Dam for the concrete New York Canal, which terminates at Lake Lowell (a.k.a. Deer Flat Reservoir) southwest of Nampa in Canyon County. The next diversion is for the Ridenbaugh Canal (1878) at Eckert Diversion Dam, immediately above Barber Park, five miles (8 km) from downtown Boise. Wooded through the city, the river is lined by an extensive recreational greenbelt. It flows west across the western end of the Snake River Plain in the Treasure Valley and becomes a braided stream with a wide floodplain as it crosses northern Canyon County to the Snake River.

History
The river was called "Reed's River" in the early 19th century, named after Pacific Fur Company employee John Reed, who explored parts of the river throughout 1813 and 1814. The river is diverted to canals for irrigation on the plain west of Boise. The dams that form the mountain reservoirs were constructed as part of the Bureau of Reclamation's "Boise Project" to provide agricultural irrigation, hydroelectricity, drinking water, and flood control to Boise and the Treasure Valley.

The major projects' initial completion dates were:

 1909 – Boise River Diversion Dam & New York Canal
 1915 – Arrowrock Dam
 1950 – Anderson Ranch Dam - (S. Fork)
 1955 – Lucky Peak Dam - (U.S. Army Corps of Engineers)

Recreation
The river is a popular destination for floating, specifically on the Boise greenbelt. Tubers and floaters launch at Barber Park and land at Ann Morrison Park, between major irrigation diversion dams. Several minor diversion weirs are passed as well as several bridges on the  trip. Water skiing is popular above the dam at the Lucky Peak Reservoir.

On the lower (warmwater) course of the river, low summer flows and poorer water quality from agricultural runoff limit fishery production. This section of river supports a fair fishery for largemouth bass, smallmouth bass, and channel catfish. Upstream from Star, the river is a coldwater stream and supports a greater variety of fish. The most prevalent species on this section is mountain whitefish, as well as hatchery-reared rainbow trout, wild rainbow trout, and fingerling brown trout. Upstream from Lucky Peak and Arrowrock reservoirs, the river and its tributaries contain excellent populations of wild rainbow trout, mountain whitefish, and bull trout.

Fishing
The Boise River is also popular for fishing, mostly for rainbow trout and, in the winter, steelhead. Spin-fishermen use roostertail spinners and bait such as worms and Powerbait, while fly fishermen use a variety of flies mimicking the abundant aquatic and terrestrial insects present in the watershed, as well as streamers.

See also

List of rivers of Idaho
List of longest streams of Idaho

References

External links

Idaho Department of Water Resources: Boise River
Idaho State University: Boise River
USGS stream gage, Boise River at Glenwood Bridge near Boise
USGS: water quality and biological trends on the lower Boise River
USBR: Boise Project
USBR: Major storage reservoirs in the Boise & Payette River basins - tea cup diagram, current data

Rivers of Idaho
Tributaries of the Snake River
Rivers of Ada County, Idaho
Rivers of Camas County, Idaho
Rivers of Boise County, Idaho
Rivers of Elmore County, Idaho
Rivers of Canyon County, Idaho